Ripped Off (also known as The Boxer and Un uomo dalla pelle dura) is a 1972 American/Italian crime film directed by Franco Prosperi and starring Robert Blake and Ernest Borgnine.

Plot
A young boxer is framed for murdering his crooked manager. His only option is to escape from jail and find the real murderer himself.

Cast
 Robert Blake: Teddy "Cherokee" Wilcox 
 Catherine Spaak: Claire Wilson
 Ernest Borgnine: Captain Perkins 
 Tomas Milian: The Stranger 
 Gabriele Ferzetti: Nick da Catarina 
 Orazio Orlando: Mike Durell

External links

1972 films
1972 crime films
American boxing films
Italian independent films
American independent films
Troma Entertainment films
Films set in the United States
Italian boxing films
1972 independent films
Italian crime films
American crime films
English-language Italian films
1970s English-language films
Films directed by Franco Prosperi
1970s American films
1970s Italian films